Violence against men is a term for violent acts that are disproportionately or exclusively committed against men or boys. Men are over-represented as both victims and perpetrators of violence.

Perceptions and aspects
Studies of social attitudes show violence is perceived as more or less serious depending on the gender of victim and perpetrator. Reporting on violence against men shows disparities; people are less likely to report a man hitting another man to the police than a man hitting a woman.

Male law enforcement officers show a greater reluctance to file charges or reports when a man is the victim of domestic violence. The use of stereotypes by law enforcement is a recognised issue, and international law scholar Solange Mouthaan argues that, in conflict scenarios, sexual violence against men has been ignored in favor of a focus on sexual violence against women and children. One explanation for this difference in focus is the physical power that men hold over women, making people more likely to condemn violence with this gender configuration.

The concept of male survivors of violence goes against social perceptions of the male gender role, leading to low recognition.

Due to perceptions of rape as a women's issue services designed to help sexual assault victims are not always equipped to handle male victims.

Men are at much higher risk of being victims of violent crime than women, while women are more fearful of violent crime. This phenomenon is termed by researchers as the "fear of crime gender paradox".

Violence against LGBT+ men 

Male homosexuality has been persecuted, often violently, through history. Termed "sodomy" during the Middle Ages and the early modern period, men found guilty of "sodomy" were often subjected to capital punishment for homosexuality.

In its December 2020 report, the International Lesbian, Gay, Bisexual, Trans and Intersex Association (ILGA) found that homosexuality is criminalized in 67 of 193 UN member states and one non-independent jurisdiction, the Cook Islands, while two UN member states, Iraq and Egypt, criminalize it de facto but not in legislation. Afghanistan, Brunei, Iran, Iraq, Mauritania, Nigeria, Saudi Arabia, Somalia, United Arab of Emirates and Yemen still allow for the prescription of the death penalty if one engages in homosexual sexual activity.

According to the Human Rights Campaign, 26 percent of gay men and 37 percent of bisexual men experience rape, physical violence, or stalking by an intimate partner, compared to 29 percent of straight men. Additionally, 40 percent of gay men and 47 percent of bisexual men have experienced sexual violence other than rape, compared to 21 percent of straight men.

Domestic violence

Female and male perpetrators of domestic violence tend to commit different types of acts of violence. For example, women are more likely to throw or hit with objects, kick, bite, or punch, while men are more likely to choke or strangle. While females do assault males, males are far more frequently perpetrators and are significantly more likely to injure, harm or kill their partners. Men are less likely to be murdered by an intimate partner than women. In the United States, in 2005, 329 men were killed by their intimate partners, compared to 1181 women.

During the lockdowns and stay in place orders that were enacted to help contain the spread of COVID-19 many nations saw drastic increases in the instances of domestic violence in the homes. This rise of domestic violence occurred globally, with an estimated 16-40% increase in calls from men to domestic violence support services. At the same time, women remained the most common victims of violence.

Men who are victims of domestic violence are at times reluctant to report it or to seek help. Shamita Das Dasgupta and Erin Pizzey are among those who argue that, as with other forms of violence against men, intimate partner violence is generally less recognized in society when the victims are men. Domestic violence accusations by males against females are often trivialized or belittled by police. Research since the 1990s has identified issues of perceived and actual bias when police are involved, with the male victim being negated even while injured. Many people, both male and female, are hesitant to report domestic violence, for example, 1.9 million people aged 16–59 told the Crime Survey for England and Wales (year ending March 2017) that they were victims of domestic violence and 79% did not report their partner or ex-partner. Of the 1.9 million, approximately 713,000 were male, while 1.2 million were female.

Mass killings

In situations of structural violence that include war and genocide, men and boys are frequently singled out and killed. The singling out of men and boys of military age occurs due the assumption that they are potential combatants and is a form of gender-based violence. These acts of violence are viewed as natural and come from the assumptions of the role of men in combat situations. This practice goes back well into recorded history with roman records from the conquering of communities point to the mass killing of the settlements men and the enslavement of its women. The murder of targets by sex during the Kosovo War, estimates of civilian male victims of mass killings suggest that they made up more than 90% of all civilian casualties.

Non-combatant men and boys have been targets of mass killings during war.  Forced conscription can also be considered gender-based violence against men. Furthermore, examples may include the filtration camps set up by Russia in occupied areas during the 2022 Russian invasion of Ukraine.

Sexual violence
According to the 2018 Family, domestic and sexual violence in Australia report, the Australian police recorded 4,100 male victims of sexual violence in 2016, as opposed to 18,900 female victims that year (thus, male victims constituted 17.8% of all victims). For male victims experiencing sexual violence since the age of 15, 55% reported a female perpetrator while 51% reported a male perpetrator (some who experienced sexual violence multiple times were victimised by men and women); by comparison, 98% of female victims since age 15 reported a male perpetrator, while 4.2% reported a female perpetrator (also some overlap here).

In 2012, The UN refugee agency issued guidelines for UNHCR staff and aid workers on how to support and treat male victims of sexual violence and rape in war and human rights situations.
The guidelines "include tips on the challenging task of identifying victims of sexual and gender-based violence (SGBV), given the stigma attached to rape".

Adult men have been forcefully circumcised, most notably in the compulsory conversion of non-Muslims to Islam and more recently especially in Kenya. In South Africa, custom allows uncircumcised Xhosa-speaking men past the age of circumcision (i.e., 25 years or older) to be overpowered by other men and forcibly circumcised. While some scholars view forced adult male circumcision as (gendered) sexual violence, the International Criminal Court ruled in 2011 that such acts were not "sexual violence," but rather fell under the label of "other inhumane acts".

War

Conscription 

Conscription, sometimes called "the draft", is the compulsory enlistment of people in a national service, most often a military service. Historically, only men have been subjected to military drafts, and currently only three countries conscript women and men on the same formal conditions: Norway, Sweden and the Netherlands.

Male-only conscription, or compulsory military service, has been criticized as sexist. Critics regard it as discriminatory to compel men, but not women, into military service. They say conscription of men normalizes male violence, conscripts are indoctrinated into sexism and violence against men, and military training socializes conscripts into patriarchal gender roles. However, some feminist organizations have resisted inclusion of women in conscription, most notably the Norwegian Association for Women's Rights.

Wartime sexual violence 
Wartime sexual violence committed by men against men is used as psychological warfare in order to demoralize the enemy. The practice is ancient, and was recorded as taking place during the Crusades. During periods of armed conflict men may be raped, sexually mutilated, sexually humiliated, forced incest, or even enslaved. Castration in particular is used as a means of physical torture with strong psychological effects, namely the loss of the ability to procreate and the loss of the status of a full man. In recent conflicts such as the Bosnian war and a number of smaller conflicts across East Africa the most commonly reported act of sexual violence was genital violence. While sexual violence in all its forms is criminalized in international law, the culture of silence around sexual violence against men often leaves male victims with no support.

In one study, less than 3% of organizations that address rape as a weapon of war, mention men or provide services to male victims.

Homicide

In the U.S., crime statistics from the 1976 onwards show that men are over-represented as victims in homicide involving both male and female offenders (74.9% of victims are male). Men also make up the majority (88%) of homicide perpetrators regardless if the victim is female or male. According to the Bureau of Justice Statistics, women who kill men are most likely to kill acquaintances, spouses or boyfriends while men are more likely to kill strangers. In many cases, women kill men due to being victims of intimate partner violence, however this research was conducted on women on death row, a sample size of approximately 97 during the last 100 years.

In Australia, men are also over-represented as victims, with the Australian Institute of Criminology finding that men are 11.5 times more likely than women to be killed by a stranger.

Data from the U.K. also shows a homicide rate for males to be twice that of females. While the proportion of homicide victims in the U.K. in the 1960s was fairly evenly split between men and women, the genders have since showed different trends: while female victim numbers remained static, male numbers increased.

Police killings 
In the United States, police killings are one of the leading causes of death for young men. The likelihood of dying as a result of police use of force is 1 in 2,000 men and 1 in 33,000 women. Studies using recent data have found that Black, Hispanic, and Native American/Alaskan individuals are disproportionately stopped by police and killed in encounters. These inequalities in turn show higher rates of death by police for people of color, particularly black men having 1 in 1,000 chance of being killed by police use of force.

Data from Australia, the European Union, and the United Kingdom also demonstrates that death while in police custody is more frequent among men.

See also
Bodily integrity
Children's rights
Male expendability
Men's rights movement
Misandry
Prison rape
Sex differences in crime
Violence against women

References

 
 
Men's health
Men's rights
Men's movement
Circumcision debate